Bruce Benson may refer to:

Bruce B. Benson (1922–1990), American physicist
Bruce L. Benson (born 1949), American academic economist
Bruce D. Benson (born 1938), former president of the University of Colorado System
Bruce Ellis Benson (born 1960), American philosopher